Synanthedon rileyana, the horsenettle borer or Riley's clearwing moth, is a moth of the family Sesiidae. It is found in the United States, including Arkansas, Arizona, Missouri, Oklahoma, North Carolina and Pennsylvania.

Adults are on wing from May to September. There are several generations per year.

The larvae feed on Solanum carolinense.

References

External links
mothphotographersgroup

Sesiidae
Moths described in 1881